The following list is a discography of production by American hip hop and R&B music producer and recording artist, Maejor (formerly Bei Maejor and Maejor Ali). It includes a list of songs produced, co-produced and remixed by year, album, artist and title.

Singles produced

2005

Bun B - Trill
11. "Hold You Down" (featuring Trey Songz, Mike Jones & Birdman)

Trey Songz - I Gotta Make It
07. "Ur Behind"

2007

Chingy - Hate It or Love It
09. "Spend Some $" (featuring Trey Songz)

Plies - The Real Testament
16. "Water"

Trey Songz - Trey Day
01. "Trey Day Intro" (featuring Bun B)
02. "Long Gone Missin"

2008

Jim Jones & Skull Gang - A Tribute to Bad Santa Starring Mike Epps
11. "Jingle Bellz" (Starr & Juelz Santana)

Letoya - Lady Love
03. "Not Anymore"

2009

Jadyn Maria
Single "Good Girls Like Bad Boys" (featuring Flo Rida)

Chrisette Michelle - Epiphany
08. "On My Own"

Ghostface Killah - Ghostdini: Wizard of Poetry in Emerald City
14. "Paragraphs of Love" (featuring Estelle)

Ginuwine - A Man's Thoughts
15. "Show Me The Way"

Trey Songz - Ready
13. "Black Roses"

2010

Monica - Still Standing
03. "Stay or Go"

Soulja Boy - The DeAndre Way
08. "Blowing Me Kisses" (produced with Clinton Sparks)
12. "Boom" (Bonus Track)

Keri Hilson - No Boys Allowed
08. "Buyou" (featuring J. Cole) (produced with Boi-1da, Matthew Burnett & Polow da Don)
13. "Hustler"  (Bonus Track)

Trey Songz - Passion, Pain & Pleasure
14. "Passion (Interlude)"
16. "Blind"

2011

Jhené Aiko - .sailing soul(s).
04. "July" (featuring Drake)
11. "You vs Them"

New Boyz - Too Cool to Care
09. "Start Me Up" (featuring Bei Maejor)

Frank Ocean - Nostalgia, Ultra
11. "Dust"

Wiz Khalifa - Rolling Papers
13. "Rooftops" (featuring Curren$y)

Travis Porter
00. "Birthday Girl"

2012

Iggy Azalea - Glory
01. "Millionaire Misfits" (featuring B.o.B and T.I.)
03. "Murda Bizness" (featuring T.I.)

Bei Maejor - Upscale
01. "Don't Stop"
02. "Moments"
03. "Fitness"
04. "Special"
05. "Enterlude"
06. "Flying Paper Planes"
07. "Mesmerized"
08. "Freak Side"
09. "The Truth"
10. "I'm Dying"
11. "Pillz"
12. "Good Nights"
13. "Exitlude"
14. "Diamond"
15. "Prayers for the Young Soul"
16. "Make it Home"

Big Time Rush
00. "Windows Down"

Austin Mahone
00 "Say Somethin"
00 "U"
00 "Shawty Shawty"

Justin Bieber - Believe
11. "One Love"
14. "Love Me Like You Do"

Maejor Ali
00. "Trouble" (featuring J. Cole)
00. "Lights Down Low" (featuring Waka Flocka Flame)
00. "Party at the Club" (co-produced with Diplo)

2013

will.i.am - #willpower
05. "Ghetto Ghetto" (featuring Baby Kaely)

Sean Paul - Full Frequency
02. "Entertainment 2.0" (featuring Juicy J, 2 Chainz & Nicki Minaj) (co-produced with SixOne, Young Yonny & Chef Tone)

Justin Bieber - Journals
01. "Heartbreaker" (co-produced with T-Minus & Chef Tone)
11. "One Life"

Rich Gang - Rich Gang
07. "Bigger Than Life" (featuring Chris Brown, Tyga, Birdman & Lil Wayne) (co-produced with Detail)

2014

Kid Ink - My Own Lane
12. "I Don't Care ft. Maejor"

Meghan Trainor - Title
01. - All About That Bass (Official Remix ft. Justin Bieber)

2015

Jake Miller - Rumors

01. "Shake It" Single

Justin Bieber - Purpose

12. "Children"
14. "Been You"
15. "Get Used to It"

Trey Songz - Trigga Reloaded
1. "About You"

Maejor - Get You Alone

R. Kelly - Buffett

14. 	"I Just Want to Thank You" (featuring Wizkid)

Upcoming

Bow Wow - Underrated
00. "Sweat" (featuring Lil Wayne) (co-produced with Detail)

References

External links
 
 
 
 

Production discographies
 
 
Hip hop discographies
Discographies of American artists
Rhythm and blues discographies
Pop music discographies

pt:Anexo:Produções musicais de Bei Maejor